Wenche Andersen (born 10 July 1954) is a Norwegian television chef.

She has worked as a television chef in TV 2 since 1994 at God morgen Norge. She had previously worked for the Opplysningskontoret for kjøtt (office for information about meat).

In 2006 she was appointed "Nordic food ambassador" in a project subordinate to the Nordic Council of Ministers. In 2017, she won the honor prize (hedersprisen) at Gullruten. The award was handed to her by the prime minister Erna Solberg.

She has authored at least 19 cookbooks.

External links 

 Official Instagram page

References

1954 births
Living people
Norwegian food writers
Norwegian television chefs
TV 2 (Norway) people
Women chefs
Women cookbook writers
Norwegian chefs